Noel Bergin is an Irish retired hurler who played as a goalkeeper for the Offaly senior team.

Born in Clareen, County Offaly, Bergin first played competitive hurling in his youth. He made his senior debut with Offaly during the 1980 championship and was sub goalkeeper for much of his career. During that time he won two Leinster medals as a non-playing substitute.

At club level Bergin is a four-time championship with Seir Kieran.

His retirement came during the 1984 All-Ireland Senior Hurling Championship.

Honours

Team

Seir Kieran
Offaly Senior Hurling Championship (1): 1988

Offaly
Leinster Senior Hurling Championship (2): 1980 (sub), 1984 (sub)

References

Living people
Seir Kieran hurlers
Offaly inter-county hurlers
Year of birth missing (living people)